Palamuru may refer to:

 Polamuru, East Godavari, a village in East Godavari district, Andhra Pradesh, India
 Polamuru, West Godavari, a village in West Godavari district, Andhra Pradesh, India